Abidiya is a town near the Nubian Desert in River Nile (state) of north-east Sudan.

Populated places in River Nile (state)